

Day 1 (16 January)
 Seeds out:
 Men's Singles:  Lucas Pouille [16],  Pablo Cuevas [22],  Albert Ramos Viñolas [26]
 Women's Singles:  Simona Halep [4],  Roberta Vinci [15],  Kiki Bertens [19],  Daria Kasatkina [23],  Laura Siegemund [26]
 Schedule of Play

Day 2 (17 January)
 Seeds out:
 Men's Singles:  Feliciano López [28]
 Women's Singles:  Samantha Stosur [18],  Tímea Babos [25]
 Schedule of Play

Day 3 (18 January)
 Seeds out:
 Men's Singles:  Marin Čilić [7],  Nick Kyrgios [14],  John Isner [19]
 Women's Singles:  Carla Suárez Navarro [10],  Zhang Shuai [20],  Irina-Camelia Begu [27],  Monica Puig [29]
 Men's Doubles:  Vasek Pospisil /  Radek Štěpánek [12]
 Women's Doubles:  Chan Hao-ching /  Chan Yung-jan [6],  Monica Niculescu /  Abigail Spears [9],  Darija Jurak /  Anastasia Rodionova [16]
 Schedule of Play

Day 4 (19 January)
 Seeds out:
 Men's Singles:  Novak Djokovic [2]
 Women's Singles:  Agnieszka Radwańska [3],  Alizé Cornet [28],  Yulia Putintseva [31]
 Men's Doubles:  Jamie Murray /  Bruno Soares [2],  Mate Pavić /  Alexander Peya [13]
 Women's Doubles:  Julia Görges /  Karolína Plíšková [7],  Lucie Hradecká /  Kateřina Siniaková [10]
 Schedule of Play

Day 5 (20 January)
 Seeds out:
 Men's Singles:  Tomáš Berdych [10],  Jack Sock [23],  Bernard Tomic [27],  Viktor Troicki [29],  Sam Querrey [31]
 Women's Singles:  Elina Svitolina [11],  Anastasija Sevastova [32]
 Men's Doubles:  Daniel Nestor /  Édouard Roger-Vasselin [8],  Rohan Bopanna /  Pablo Cuevas [15]
 Mixed Doubles:  Lucie Hradecká /  Radek Štěpánek [7]
 Schedule of Play

Day 6 (21 January) 
 Seeds out:
 Men's Singles:  Richard Gasquet [18],  Ivo Karlović [20],  David Ferrer [21],  Alexander Zverev [24],  Gilles Simon [25],  Pablo Carreño Busta [30],  Philipp Kohlschreiber [32]
 Women's Singles:   Dominika Cibulková [6],  Timea Bacsinszky [12],  Elena Vesnina [14],  Caroline Wozniacki [17],  Caroline Garcia [21]
 Men's Doubles:  Raven Klaasen /  Rajeev Ram [6],  Treat Huey /  Max Mirnyi [10]
 Women's Doubles:  Martina Hingis /  Coco Vandeweghe [5],  Kiki Bertens /  Johanna Larsson [14]

 Schedule of Play

Day 7 (22 January) 
 Seeds out:
 Men's Singles:  Andy Murray [1],  Kei Nishikori [5]
 Women's Singles:  Angelique Kerber [1],  Svetlana Kuznetsova [8]
 Men's Doubles:  Feliciano López /  Marc López [5],  Jean-Julien Rojer /  Horia Tecău [11],  Dominic Inglot /  Florin Mergea [16]
 Women's Doubles:  Sania Mirza  /  Barbora Strýcová [4],  Vania King /  Yaroslava Shvedova [8]
 Mixed Doubles:  Andrea Hlaváčková /  Édouard Roger-Vasselin [3],  Chan Hao-ching /  Max Mirnyi [4],  Barbora Krejčíková /  Rajeev Ram [8]
 Schedule of Play

Day 8 (23 January) 
 Seeds out
 Men's Singles:  Gaël Monfils [6],  Dominic Thiem [8],  Roberto Bautista Agut [13]
 Women's Singles:  Barbora Strýcová [16],  Daria Gavrilova [22],  Ekaterina Makarova [30]
 Men's Doubles:  Łukasz Kubot  /  Marcelo Melo [7],  Juan Sebastián Cabal  /  Robert Farah [14]
 Women's Doubles:  Katarina Srebotnik  /  Zheng Saisai [13]
 Schedule of Play

Day 9 (24 January) 
 Seeds out
 Men's Singles:  Jo-Wilfried Tsonga [12]
 Women's Singles:  Garbiñe Muguruza [7],  Anastasia Pavlyuchenkova [24]
 Men's Doubles:  Ivan Dodig /  Marcel Granollers [9]
 Women's Doubles:  Ekaterina Makarova /  Elena Vesnina [3],  Raquel Atawo /  Xu Yifan [11]
 Mixed Doubles:  Chan Yung-jan /  Łukasz Kubot [5],  Kateřina Siniaková /  Bruno Soares [6]
 Schedule of Play

Day 10 (25 January) 
 Seeds out
 Men's Singles:  Milos Raonic [3],  David Goffin [11]
 Women's Singles:  Karolína Plíšková [5],  Johanna Konta [9]
 Men's Doubles:  Pierre-Hugues Herbert /  Nicolas Mahut [1]
 Women's Doubles:  Caroline Garcia /  Kristina Mladenovic [1]
 Schedule of Play

Day 11 (26 January) 
 Seeds out
 Men's Singles:  Stan Wawrinka [4]
 Mixed Doubles:  Bethanie Mattek-Sands /  Mike Bryan [1]
 Schedule of Play

Day 12 (27 January) 
 Seeds out
 Men's Singles:  Grigor Dimitrov [15]
 Women's Doubles:  Andrea Hlaváčková /  Peng Shuai [12]
 Schedule of Play

Day 13 (28 January) 
 Seeds out
 Women's Singles:  Venus Williams [13]
 Men's Doubles:  Bob Bryan /  Mike Bryan [3]
 Schedule of Play

Day 14 (29 January) 
 Seeds out
 Men's Singles:  Rafael Nadal [9]
 Mixed Doubles:  Sania Mirza /  Ivan Dodig [2]
 Schedule of Play

Day-by-day summaries
Australian Open (tennis) by year – Day-by-day summaries